Leopold Alphonso (born 9 June 1991) is a Malaysian footballer playing for Sabah FA and currently playing for Kinabalu Jaguar F.C. in Malaysia M3 League.

A former Bukit Jalil Sports School trainee, Leopold made his debut for Sabah in the match against Sinar Dimaja Mai Sarah FC. He also score his first Malaysian League goal in that match.

Honours

Club
Sabah
 Malaysia Premier League 
Promotion: 2010
 Malaysia Premier League 
 2019

References

Malaysian footballers
People from Sabah
Living people
1991 births
Sabah F.C. (Malaysia) players
Association football forwards